CCCTV is a Canadian Chinese-language specialty channel  broadcasts programming in Cantonese and Mandarin and airs content from China, Hong Kong and Taiwan as well as local Canadian programming.

CCCTV is a general entertainment service and features a wide array of programming including news, sports, dramas, traditional operas, cultural programmes and much more.  It also airs extensive local programming includes news, traffic and weather reports as well as sports shows and business shows.

External links
 CCCTV 

Digital cable television networks in Canada
Chinese-language mass media in Canada
Companies based in Markham, Ontario
Multicultural and ethnic television in Canada
Television channels and stations established in 2013
2013 establishments in Ontario